Youssouf Koné (born 5 July 1995) is a Malian professional footballer who plays as a left-back for French  club Ajaccio, on loan from Lyon, and the Mali national team.

Club career
Koné is a youth team graduate from Lille. He made his Ligue 1 debut on 2 March 2014 in a 3–2 away win over Ajaccio. His second appearance came on 12 April 2014, a league game against Valenciennes.

Koné spent the first half of the 2017–18 season at Ligue 2 side Reims on loan after being loaned out by Head Coach Marcelo Bielsa. The full-season loan contract was terminated early when he suffered a cruciate ligament injury.

Following the departures of both Fodé Ballo-Touré to Monaco and Hamza Mendyl to Schalke 04, Koné established himself as first-choice left-back under Galtier post-Christmas In Lille's excellent 2018–19 campaign, finishing second to Paris Saint-Germain.

On 3 July 2019, he signed a contract with Lyon. The fee was estimated at €9 million. On 29 September of the following year, after just 11 league appearances, he was loaned to La Liga side Elche for one year. On 1 February 2021, Elche and Lyon, agreed to terminate the loan of Koné, due to a lack of playing time. On the same day, Koné was loaned to Turkish club Hatayspor.

On 30 August 2022, Lyon announced Koné's loan to Ajaccio for the 2022–23 season.

International career
Koné debuted for the Mali national team in a 2017 Africa Cup of Nations qualification match against Benin on 6 September 2016.

Career statistics

Scores and results list Mali's goal tally first, score column indicates score after each Koné goal.

Honors
Mali U20
FIFA U-20 World Cup bronze:2015

References

External links

Eurosport profile
ESPN profile

1995 births
Living people
Sportspeople from Bamako
Association football defenders
Malian footballers
Lille OSC players
Stade de Reims players
Olympique Lyonnais players
Elche CF players
ES Troyes AC players
AC Ajaccio players
Ligue 1 players
Ligue 2 players
La Liga players
2017 Africa Cup of Nations players
2019 Africa Cup of Nations players
Mali international footballers
Malian expatriate footballers
Malian expatriate sportspeople in France
Malian expatriate sportspeople in Spain
Expatriate footballers in France
Expatriate footballers in Spain
21st-century Malian people